The Print Shop is a basic desktop publishing software package originally published in 1984 by Broderbund. It was unique in that it provided libraries of clip art and templates through a simple interface to build signs, posters and banners with household dot-matrix printers. Over the years, the software has been updated to accommodate changing file formats and printer technologies.

The original version was for the Apple II and created signs, cards, banners, and letterheads. Designed by David Balsam and programmed by Martin Kahn, it became one of the most popular Apple II titles of all time. Versions for MS-DOS, Commodore 64, and the Atari 8-bit family followed, as did a variant for the Apple IIGS.

Reception
The Print Shop was very successful. In 1985, it and Ghostbusters were reportedly the two most widely pirated Commodore 64 programs. II Computing listed it seventh on the magazine's list of top Apple II non-game, non-educational software as of late 1985, based on sales and market-share data. In 1988, Broderbund announced that the company had sold more than one million copies, and that sales of the software comprised 4% of the entire United States software market in 1987. In April 1989, it was awarded a "Diamond" certification from the Software Publishers Association for sales above 500,000 units. The series comprised 29% of Broderbund revenue in fiscal year 1992.

Ahoy!s reviewer called the Commodore 64 version of The Print Shop "one of the best thought out, easiest to use packages I've come across", reporting that he did not need to use the manual to produce his first greeting cards. He predicted that the software "is destined to become one of the most popular packages for the Commodore 64". II Computing criticized the Apple II version's inflexible layout options and lack of print preview, but concluded that it "is truly 'a graphics utility for the rest of us', encouraging creativity and self-expression ... you'll want to use this program over and over again".

The Print Shop Companion
The Print Shop Companion, developed by Roland Gustafsson and released in 1985, added a calendar feature, an updated graphic editor, font and border editors, and a "Creature Maker" game, as well as an expanded library of fonts, borders, and graphics.  Initially, to use the new fonts and borders in The Print Shop Companion had to modify the original program; subsequent releases of The Print Shop included built-in support for Companion.

In 1986, the first Apple Macintosh version was released. It featured graphics by Marney Morris and was the most powerful version available at the time. It was popular in schools and contained a unique feature with which graphics could be transferred to or from a MacPaint file.

Graphics libraries for The Print Shop came from Broderbund and other vendors. Libraries were produced for the original version and continued to be rolled out as late as the 1990s.  User-produced graphics were also commonly distributed by various user groups, and even submitted to disk magazines, such as the Softdisk family of magazines.

The New Print Shop and subsequent versions

The New Print Shop came out in 1988 for Apple II and MS-DOS, and improved on the original. Print Shop Deluxe, for Mac, MS-DOS, and Windows, followed in 1993. Deluxe used a new all-graphical interface still found in Print Shop programs today and allowed for the creation of calendars. Print Shop Deluxe Companion added new modules and graphics, and the Ensemble version combined The Print Shop, the Companion, and several graphics libraries on one CD.

Many new versions of The Print Shop followed, such as Ensemble II. Now over 20 years old, Print Shop still generates printed greeting cards, banners, and signs. It offers new types of printed output, including CD and DVD labels and inserts, iPod skins, and photo book pages. For small-business users, it also offers projects such as business cards, letterheads, and presentations.

On January 15, 2010, a new version for the PC-supporting Windows 7 titled The Print Shop 2.0 was released, published by Encore, Inc. It is published in Standard, Deluxe, and Professional variants.

To address Windows 7 support for pre-2.0 projects, an incremental release to the old line, The Print Shop Version 2.1 was released in July 2010.

For macOS (formerly Mac OS X), the most recent version is 4.0, developed and published by Software MacKiev, and released in December 2017. An update to provide 64-bit compatibility (version 4.1) was released in December 2021.

Reception
Print Shop Deluxe was reviewed in the Oppenheim Toy Portfolio Guide Book where it was praised for "produc[ing] high-quality greeting-cards, signs, stationary, banners, calendars, gift tags and posters".

Notes

External links
 Current site for The Print Shop 23 for Windows 10
 Current site for The Print Shop for PC & Mac
 Broderbund website
 Original Broderbund website
The Print Shop Club, an Apple 2 version running in emulation in the browser

Desktop publishing software
Apple II software
Atari 8-bit family software
Commodore 64 software
DOS software
Classic Mac OS software
Desktop publishing software for Windows
1984 software